This is a list of 103 species in Tanymecus, a genus of broad-nosed weevils in the family Curculionidae.

Tanymecus species

 Tanymecus abyssinicus Hustache, 1920 c g
 Tanymecus agricola Marshall, 1920 c g
 Tanymecus albicans Rosenhauer, 1856 c g
 Tanymecus alboscutellatus Chevrolat, 1869 c g
 Tanymecus albus Gebler, 1830 c g
 Tanymecus alienus Faust, 1895 c g
 Tanymecus arenaceus Marshall, 1916 c g
 Tanymecus ariasi Escalera, 1914 c g
 Tanymecus arushanus Marshall, 1929 c g
 Tanymecus aureosauamosus Linell, 1896 c g
 Tanymecus bayeri Hustache, 1924 c g
 Tanymecus benguelensis Hustache, 1923 c g
 Tanymecus bidentatus Gebler, 1830 c g
 Tanymecus biplagiatus Marshall, 1935 c g
 Tanymecus boettcheri Voss, 1922 c g
 Tanymecus brachyderoides Faust, 1895 c g
 Tanymecus breviformis Reitter, 1903 c g
 Tanymecus brevirostris Aurivillius, 1910 c g
 Tanymecus brevis Chevrolat, 1860 c g
 Tanymecus bulgaricus Angelov, 1990 c g
 Tanymecus burmanus Marshall, 1916 c g
 Tanymecus cervinus Fahraeus, 1840 c g
 Tanymecus confusus Say, 1831 i c g b
 Tanymecus confususconfertus Gyllenhal, 1834 c g
 Tanymecus costulicollis Fairmaire, 1901 c g
 Tanymecus crassicornis Solari, 1904 c g
 Tanymecus curviscapus Marshall, 1916 c g
 Tanymecus deceptor Marshall, 1916 c g
 Tanymecus destructor Marshall, 1920 c g
 Tanymecus dilaticollis Gyllenhal, 1834 c g
 Tanymecus discolor Gyllenhal, 1834 c g
 Tanymecus excursor Faust, 1890 c g
 Tanymecus fausti Desbrochers des Loges, 1884 c g
 Tanymecus fimbriatus Faust, 1899 c g
 Tanymecus fruhstorferi Faust, 1896 c g
 Tanymecus furcatus Marshall, 1952 c g
 Tanymecus hirsutus Champion, 1911 c g
 Tanymecus hirticeps Marshall, 1916 c g
 Tanymecus hispidus Marshall, 1916 c g
 Tanymecus humilis Erichson, 1843 c g
 Tanymecus inaffectatus Fåhraeus, 1871 c g
 Tanymecus indicus Faust, 1895 c g
 Tanymecus infimus Thomson J., 1858 c g
 Tanymecus insipidus Chevrolat, 1878 c g
 Tanymecus kolenatii Reitter, 1903 c g
 Tanymecus konbiranus Marshall, 1916 c g
 Tanymecus kricheldorffi Reitter, 1915 c g
 Tanymecus lacaena (Herbst, 1797) i c g b
 Tanymecus laminipes Marshall, 1951 c g
 Tanymecus latifrous Faust, 1899 c g
 Tanymecus lautus Le Conte, 1854 c g
 Tanymecus lectus Marshall, 1916 c g
 Tanymecus lineatus Gyllenhal, 1834 c g
 Tanymecus lomii Hustache, 1938 c g
 Tanymecus luridus Gestro, 1895 c g
 Tanymecus makkaliensis Fåhraeus, 1871 c g
 Tanymecus masaicus Voss, 1962 c g
 Tanymecus merus Marshall, 1954 c g
 Tanymecus metallinus Fairmaire, 1866 c g
 Tanymecus micans Hustache, 1920 c g
 Tanymecus migrans Fahraeus, 1840 c g
 Tanymecus mixtus Hustache, 1921 c g
 Tanymecus modicus Marshall, 1916 c g
 Tanymecus morosus Fairmaire, 1901 c g
 Tanymecus mozambicus Hustache, 1920 c g
 Tanymecus musculus Fahraeus, 1840 c g
 Tanymecus nevadensis Desbrochers des Loges, 1872 c g
 Tanymecus obconicicollis Voss, 1937 c g
 Tanymecus obscuriusculus Voss, 1962 c g
 Tanymecus obscurus Marshall, 1916 c g
 Tanymecus obsoletus Reitter, 1890 c g
 Tanymecus oculatus Chevrolat, 1880 c g
 Tanymecus orientalis Hustache, 1921 c g
 Tanymecus ovalipennis Hustache, 1935 c g
 Tanymecus palliatus (Fabricius, 1787) c g
 Tanymecus parkiensis Ahmed, Rizvi, Akhter et Yasir, 2006 c g
 Tanymecus parvus Desbrochers des Loges, 1891 c g
 Tanymecus perrieri (Fairmaire, 1900) c g
 Tanymecus piger Marshall, 1916 c g
 Tanymecus pisciformis (Fairmaire, 1899) c g
 Tanymecus ponticus Arnoldi & Blinstein, 1971 c g
 Tanymecus potteri Hustache, 1920 c g
 Tanymecus princeps (Faust, 1891) c g
 Tanymecus pseudohispidus Rizvi, Ahmed et Naz, 2003 c g
 Tanymecus pubirostris Reitter, 1903 c g
 Tanymecus rapax Marshall, 1939 c g
 Tanymecus revelierei Tournier, 1875 c g
 Tanymecus rhodopus Fåhraeus, 1871 c g
 Tanymecus seclusus Faust, 1895 c g
 Tanymecus sitonoides A. Solari & F. Solari, 1909 c g
 Tanymecus sparsus Fahraeus, 1840 c g
 Tanymecus submaculatus Chevrolat, 1860 c g
 Tanymecus telephus Reitter, 1903 c g
 Tanymecus tenuis Reitter, 1903 c g
 Tanymecus tessellatus Marshall, 1935 c g
 Tanymecus tetricus Faust, 1897 c g
 Tanymecus texanus Van Dyke, 1935 i g b
 Tanymecus tonsus Marshall, 1935 c g
 Tanymecus trivialis Fahraeus, 1840 c g
 Tanymecus vagabundus Chevrolat, 1880 c g
 Tanymecus variabilis Fahraeus, 1840 c g
 Tanymecus versutus Faust, 1895 c g
 Tanymecus villicus Fahraeus, 1840 c g

Data sources: i = ITIS, c = Catalogue of Life, g = GBIF, b = Bugguide.net

References

Tanymecus
Articles created by Qbugbot